Donald Gary Rose (born March 19, 1947) is a former professional baseball player who played three seasons for the New York Mets, California Angels, and San Francisco Giants of Major League Baseball.

On May 24, 1972, Rose became only the third Major League pitcher in history to hit a home run on the very first pitch they faced in their first plate appearance. It was the only home run of his Major League career.

See also
List of Major League Baseball players with a home run in their first major league at bat

References

External links
, or Retrosheet, or Pelota Binaria (Venezuelan Winter League)

1947 births
Living people
Baseball players from California
California Angels players
Cardenales de Lara players
American expatriate baseball players in Venezuela
Florida Instructional League Mets players
Major League Baseball pitchers
Memphis Blues players
New York Mets players
People from Covina, California
Phoenix Giants players
Salt Lake City Angels players
San Francisco Giants players
Stanford Cardinal baseball players
Tidewater Tides players
Visalia Mets players
Alaska Goldpanners of Fairbanks players